Biliary reflux, bile reflux (gastritis), duodenogastroesophageal  reflux  (DGER) or duodenogastric reflux is a condition that occurs when bile and/or other contents like bicarbonate, and pancreatic enzymes flow upward (refluxes) from the duodenum into the stomach and esophagus.

Biliary reflux can be confused with acid reflux, also known as gastroesophageal reflux disease (GERD). While bile reflux involves fluid from the small intestine flowing into the stomach and esophagus, acid reflux is backflow of stomach acid into the esophagus. These conditions are often related, and differentiating between the two can be difficult.

Bile is a digestive fluid made by the liver, stored in the gallbladder, and discharged into duodenum after food is ingested to aid in the digestion of fat. Normally, the pyloric sphincter prevents bile from entering the stomach. When the pyloric sphincter is damaged or fails to work correctly, bile can enter the stomach and then be transported into the esophagus as in gastric reflux. The presence of small amounts of bile in the stomach is relatively common and usually asymptomatic, but excessive refluxed bile causes irritation and inflammation.
Bile reflux has been associated with gastric cancer, chemical gastritis and the development of ulcers.

Symptoms and signs
 Frequent heartburn
 Pain in the upper part of the abdomen
 Vomiting bile and or Regurgitation (digestion)
 Hypersalivation
Bile reflux can be asymptomatic when lying down or after eating, as bile reflux occurs physiologically.

Diagnosis
Bile reflux is usually associated with:
 Erosive esophagitis
 Barrett's esophagus

Management
Ursodeoxycholic acid is an adequate treatment of bile reflux gastritis. The dosage is usually of /day and for a 4 weeks treatment.

Medications used in managing biliary reflux include bile acid sequestrants, particularly cholestyramine, which disrupt the circulation of bile in the digestive tract and sequester bile that would otherwise cause symptoms when refluxed; and prokinetic agents, to move material from the stomach to the small bowel more rapidly and prevent reflux.

Surgery
Biliary reflux may also be treated surgically, if medications are ineffective or if precancerous tissue is present in the esophagus.

Epidemiology
Obesity is an independent risk factor for development of bile reflux.
Bile reflux is very infrequent in healthy individuals.

References

External links
 The damage of reflux
 Bile Reflux page at CNN Health:symptoms, causes, diagnosis, treatment, prevention

Diseases of oesophagus, stomach and duodenum